is a Japanese actress from Ibaraki Prefecture. She has appeared in various tokusatsu dramas. Her most prominent roles were as Nanako Shimada in Kamen Rider Ryuki and Smart Lady in Kamen Rider 555. She also sang her character's song on the Kamen Rider 555 soundtrack entitled "My Name is Smart Lady."

Filmography
 Kamen Rider Ryuki (2002-2003) – Nanako Shimada
 Kamen Rider Ryuki Special: 13 Riders (2002) – Nanako Shimada
 Kamen Rider Ryuki: Episode Final (2002) – Nanako Shimada
 Kamen Rider 555 (2003-2004) – "Smart Lady"
 Kamen Rider 555: Paradise Lost (2003) – Smart Lady
 Kamen Rider 555: Hyper Battle Video (Faiz the Musical) (2003) – Smart Lady
 Kamen Rider Den-O (2007) – Yumi Saitō (Episodes 7-8)
 Specter (2005) – Makino
 Tokyo Tower: Mom and Me, and Sometimes Dad (2007)
 Shibuya kaidan: The riaru toshi densetsu (2006)
 Jam Films (2002) – (segment "Justice")

References
Flourish - Personal blog 

1981 births
People from Ibaraki Prefecture
Living people
Japanese actresses